Acronicta dahurica is a moth of the family Noctuidae. It is found in China and the Russian Far East.

External links
Description

Acronicta
Moths of Asia
Moths described in 2008